Mihai Florea (1929 – 1986) was a publicist, theater historian, and script writer for radio and television. He was born in Buzău.  Florea was presenter of the popular program Floarea din Grădină on the Romanian Television.

1929 births
1986 deaths